Matías Ezequiel Rodríguez (born 29 March 1993) is an Argentine professional footballer who plays as a midfielder for Alvarado.

Career
Rodríguez began with Chacarita Juniors, with whom he made his debut with in February 2013 against Godoy Cruz in the Copa Argentina. He also made four league appearances in 2012–13, prior to twenty-three in 2013–14 as well as scoring his first two career goals versus Flandria and Nueva Chicago respectively. Sixteen appearances came in Chacarita's promotion-winning season of 2014 to Primera B Nacional, while twenty arrived three years later in 2016–17 as the club were promoted to the Argentine Primera División. His top-flight debut came against Tigre on 10 September 2017. He signed a new contract with them days later.

He made his 100th and final Chacarita appearance in May 2018, featuring in a Copa Argentina match with Deportivo Maipú. On 15 June, Rodríguez completed a transfer to Nemzeti Bajnokság I side Ferencváros of Hungary. Six appearances followed in all competitions in five months, with the midfielder leaving in January 2019 to join Universidad Católica of the Ecuadorian Serie A. His first appearance came in a win away to Técnico Universitario on 11 February, while his last would arrive on 2 November against América de Quito. January 2020 saw Rodríguez switch Ecuador for Colombia by joining Cúcuta Deportivo.

Rodríguez scored goals versus Deportivo Cali and Independiente Medellín across fifteen appearances for Cúcuta Deportivo in 2020, a campaign that ended prematurely for the club after they were liquidated. Earlier in the season, in February, the midfielder was fined $52,668,180 and suspended for two matches after being charged of deceiving the match officials to win a penalty against Alianza Petrolera on 8 February; the country's player union called the fine "disproportionate". He was the first player to be punished for that offence under new legislation. Cúcuta had previously been unable to pay wages to their squad.

In February 2021, Rodríguez returned to Argentina and joined Alvarado.

Career statistics
.

References

External links

1993 births
Living people
People from Tres de Febrero Partido
Argentine footballers
Argentine expatriate footballers
Association football midfielders
Primera B Metropolitana players
Primera Nacional players
Argentine Primera División players
Nemzeti Bajnokság I players
Ecuadorian Serie A players
Categoría Primera A players
Chacarita Juniors footballers
Ferencvárosi TC footballers
C.D. Universidad Católica del Ecuador footballers
Expatriate footballers in Hungary
Expatriate footballers in Ecuador
Expatriate footballers in Colombia
Argentine expatriate sportspeople in Hungary
Argentine expatriate sportspeople in Ecuador
Argentine expatriate sportspeople in Colombia
Sportspeople from Buenos Aires Province